Hibbard Houston Shedd (January 27, 1847 – October 6, 1905) was an American politician who served as the fourth lieutenant governor of Nebraska from 1885 to 1889.

Shedd was born in Denmark, Iowa in 1847, the only son of George Shedd, a medical doctor, and Abigail Houston.  In 1864 he joined the army and fought in the American Civil War as a part of the 45th Regiment Iowa Volunteer Infantry.  In 1871, he moved to Ashland, Nebraska.  He was a member of the Nebraska constitutional convention in 1875, and became Speaker of the Nebraska House in 1881.  In 1885, he was elected lieutenant governor, and served for two terms.

Shedd married Katharine Lee Graves in 1874, and had six children.  Shedd died on October 6, 1905.

Shedd's son George Clifford Shedd became a novelist, whose works included The Incorrigible Dukane.

References

1847 births
1905 deaths
Lieutenant Governors of Nebraska
Nebraska Republicans
People from Lee County, Iowa
People from Ashland, Nebraska
Speakers of the Nebraska Legislature
Union Army soldiers
19th-century American politicians